The Working Class Party (WCP) is a left-wing, working class political party, based in Detroit, Michigan, United States. The Working Class Party competed in the 2016 Michigan election, presenting three candidates. The party filed twelve candidates in the 2020 election, five for the U.S. Congress, two for the Michigan State Board of Education, and five for the Michigan House of Representatives. As of November 2022, the party has ballot access in Illinois, Maryland and Michigan.

Other candidates who shared many of the same ideas as the Working Class Party appeared as "non-partisan" (independent) candidates on the ballot in Chicago in 2015; in Baltimore in 2016 and 2020; and in Los Angeles in 2018.

History 
The party can be traced back to a campaign carried out by people around the Trotskyist newspaper The Spark between 2011 and 2013. That campaign focused on the need for the working class to organize independently. Five of the people active in that campaign ran for office in 2014 (although they were on the ballot as non-party candidates). The candidates ran for Congress, for the Dearborn School Board and for the Wayne County Community College Trustee. The latter was elected due to his only opponent, the Democratic incumbent, being disqualified before the election.

Despite the harsh ballot access laws in Michigan, the people active in the 2014 campaign managed to put a party on the ballot in 2016. With several dozen others joining the voluntary effort, they turned in more than the required 31,566 petition signatures. In the end they turned in more than 50,000. The Working Class Party fielded two candidates for Congress and one for the State Board of Education in Michigan.

The WCP candidate for the State Board of Education polled 2.7%, many more than the 22,133 votes needed for the Working Class Party to retain ballot status in the Michigan 2018 elections.

Similar campaigns in other states included for alderman in Chicago in the 25th ward. Candidate Ed Hershey received 614 votes (8.23%). In 2016, David Harding was on the ballot for Baltimore's City Council elections, running in the 14th district. He received 1,426 votes, (8.3%). In 2018, Juan Rey ran as a candidate in California's 29th congressional district for the U.S. House of Representatives. He received 944 votes (1.45%).

In the 2018 midterm elections, the Working Class Party ran eleven candidates in Michigan; five for the U.S. House, four for the Michigan state senate and two statewide candidates for the Michigan State Board of Education. Most candidates were fielded in districts in and around Detroit, but the party was also contesting districts in Grand Rapids, Flint and Saginaw. The party won between 1.2% and 11.4% of the votes.

In the 2020 elections, the Working Class Party ran twelve candidates in Michigan; five candidates for the US House of Representatives, five candidates for the State House and two candidates for State Board of Education and David Harding for the mayor of Baltimore. The party gained between 0.6% and 4.8% of the votes in the seats contested.

As of December 2020, 2,102 voters were affiliated with the WCP in Maryland. The party announced plans to run candidates for governor in 2022 and for president in 2024 in order to maintain ballot access in Maryland.

Ideology 
The party is actively endorsed by Spark. The party supports broad positions such as putting an end to unemployment and stopping the decline of pensions and social security. They call for workers to look into the books of businesses. They call for the unity of workers against the divide created by the bosses. The party also supports the formation of a vanguard party for the working class, as they maintain that both the Republican, as well as the Democratic party, are controlled by big capital.

Election results

See also 
 The Spark (US Trotskyist group with ties to Lutte Ouvrière)

References

2016 establishments in Michigan
Organizations based in Detroit
Political parties established in 2014
Political parties in Michigan
Progressive parties in the United States
Socialist parties in the United States
Socialism in Maryland
Political parties in Maryland
State and local socialist parties in the United States